In mathematics, and more particularly in polyhedral combinatorics, Eberhard's theorem partially characterizes the multisets of polygons that can form the faces of simple convex polyhedra. It states that, for given numbers of triangles, quadrilaterals, pentagons, heptagons, and other polygons other than hexagons,
there exists a convex polyhedron with those given numbers of faces of each type (and an unspecified number of hexagonal faces) if and only if those numbers of polygons obey a linear equation derived from Euler's polyhedral formula.

The theorem is named after Victor Eberhard, a blind German mathematician, who published it in 1888 in his habilitation thesis and in expanded form in an 1891 book on polyhedra.

Definitions and statement
A three-dimensional convex polyhedron is defined to be simple when every vertex of the polyhedron is incident to exactly three edges. In a simple polygon, every vertex is incident to three angles of faces, and every edge is incident to two sides of faces.

and

Plugging these values into Euler's polyhedral formula  and clearing denominators leads to the equation

which must be satisfied by the face counts of every simple polyhedron. However,

Examples
There are three simple Platonic solids, the tetrahedron, cube, and dodecahedron. The tetrahedron has , the cube has , and the dodecahedron has , with all other values of  being zero. These three assignments of numbers to  all obey the equation that Eberhard's theorem requires them to obey.

There is no simple convex polyhedron with three triangle faces, three pentagon faces, and no other faces. However, Eberhard's theorem states that it should be possible to form a simple polyhedron by adding some number of hexagons, and in this case one hexagon suffices: bisecting a cube on a regular hexagon passing through six of its faces produces two copies of a simple roofless polyhedron with three triangle faces, three pentagon faces, and one hexagon face. That is, setting  suffices in this case to produce a realizable combination of face counts.

Related results
An analogous result to Eberhard's theorem holds for the existence of polyhedra in which all vertices are incident to exactly four edges. In this case the equation derived from Euler's formula is not affected by the number  of quadrilaterals, and for every assignment to the numbers of faces of other types that obeys this equation it is possible to choose a number of quadrilaterals that allows a 4-regular polyhedron to be realized.

A theorem of David W. Barnette provides a lower bound on the number of hexagons that are needed, whenever the number of faces of order seven or higher is at least three. It states that, in these cases,

For polygons with few pentagons and many high-order faces, this inequality can force the number of hexagons to be arbitrarily large. More strongly, it can be used to find assignments to the numbers of faces for which the required number of hexagons cannot be bounded by any function of the maximum number of sides of a face.

Analogues of Eberhard's theorem have also been studied for other systems of faces and face counts than simple convex polyhedra, for instance for toroidal graphs and for tessellations.

See also
Erdős–Gallai theorem
Grinberg's theorem

References

Polyhedral combinatorics